Stonkers is a strategy video game for the ZX Spectrum published by Imagine Software in 1983. It was written by John Gibson with graphics by Paul Lindale. In 2013, TechRadar called it an early example of a real-time strategy game.

Gameplay
Stonkers is controlled either using keyboard or joystick. In the game, the player controls infantry, artillery, tank, and supply-truck units.  Combat units consume supplies over time and the player must use the supply units to replenish them.  Supply units are unloaded while a ship docks at the player's port. Information about ongoing events is displayed in a ticker tape on the bottom of the screen.

Reception
It was awarded the title "Best Wargame" by CRASH in 1984.

References

External links 

1983 video games
ZX Spectrum games
ZX Spectrum-only games
Video games developed in the United Kingdom
Real-time strategy video games
Tank simulation video games